The 1997–98 Florida Panthers season was the Panthers' fifth season. After making the Stanley Cup playoffs in 1997, the Panthers failed to qualify for the playoffs.

Offseason

Regular season
The Panthers' penalty kill struggled during the regular season and they allowed the most power-play goals in the NHL (82) and had the lowest penalty-kill percentage (79.65%). They also tied the Chicago Blackhawks, New York Islanders and Pittsburgh Penguins for the most short-handed goals allowed, with 16.

On November 26, 1997, the Panthers defeated the Boston Bruins at home by a score of 10-5. Veteran forward Ray Sheppard had a hat trick in the game. It was the first time in franchise history that the Panthers had scored 10 goals in a regular-season game. It also came exactly one year after the last NHL team had scored 10 goals in a regular-season game, as the Edmonton Oilers had defeated their provincial rival Calgary Flames on the road by a score of 10-1 on November 26, 1996.

Final standings

Schedule and results

Player statistics

Note: Pos = Position; GP = Games played; G = Goals; A = Assists; Pts = Points; +/- = plus/minus; PIM = Penalty minutes; PPG = Power-play goals; SHG = Short-handed goals; GWG = Game-winning goals
      MIN = Minutes played; W = Wins; L = Losses; T = Ties; GA = Goals-against; GAA = Goals-against average; SO = Shutouts; SA = Shots against; SV = Shots saved; SV% = Save percentage;

Awards and records

Transactions

Draft picks
Florida's draft picks at the 1997 NHL Entry Draft held at the Civic Arena in Pittsburgh, Pennsylvania.

See also
1997–98 NHL season

References
 

F
F
Florida Panthers seasons
Florida Panthers
Florida Panthers